The following is a list of notable events and releases of the year 1905 in Norwegian music.

Events

Deaths

Births

 February
 22 – Elling Enger, composer and organist (died 1979).

 October
 24 – Kristian Hauger, pianist, orchestra leader and composer of popular music (died 1977).

See also
 1905 in Norway
 Music of Norway

References

 
Norwegian music
Norwegian
Music
1900s in Norwegian music